

Origin
Along with the Rochester and Pittsburgh Railroad Company, the Pittsburgh and State Line Railroad Company emerged on 29 January 1881 from the remains of the Rochester and State Line Railroad when it was acquired by a New York syndicate.

Other sources
 http://www.silverlakeview.com/br&p/br&p.htm

Defunct Pennsylvania railroads
Railway companies established in 1881
Railway companies disestablished in 1885
American companies established in 1881
American companies disestablished in 1885